Euophryini is a tribe of jumping spiders. It has also been treated as the subfamily Euophryinae.

Taxonomy

Genera
Wayne Maddison in 2015 placed 116 extant genera in the tribe. Some genera have since been split up and other genera have been added.

Agobardus Keyserling, 1885
Allodecta Bryant, 1950
Amphidraus Simon, 1900
Anasaitis Bryant, 1950
Antillattus Bryant, 1943
Araneotanna Özdikmen & Kury, 2006
Aruattus Logunov & Azarkina, 2008
Asaphobelis Simon, 1902, included in Coryphasia by Zhang & Maddison (2015)
Ascyltus Karsch, 1878
Athamas O. Pickard-Cambridge, 1877
Barraina Richardson, 2013
Bathippus Thorell, 1892
Baviola Simon, 1898
Belliena Simon, 1902
Bindax Thorell, 1892
Bulolia Żabka, 1996
Bythocrotus Simon, 1903
Canama Simon, 1903
Caribattus Bryant, 1950
Chalcolecta Simon, 1884
Chalcolemia Zhang & Maddison, 2012
Chalcoscirtus Bertkau, 1880
Chalcotropis Simon, 1902
Chapoda Peckham & Peckham, 1896
Charippus Thorell, 1895
Chinophrys Zhang & Maddison, 2012
Cobanus F. O. Pickard-Cambridge, 1900, included in Sidusa by Zhang & Maddison (2015)
Coccorchestes Thorell, 1881
Colyttus Thorell, 1891
Commoris Simon, 1902
Compsodecta Simon, 1903
Corticattus Zhang & Maddison, 2012
Coryphasia Simon, 1902
Corythalia C. L. Koch, 1850
Cytaea Keyserling, 1882
Darwinneon Cutler, 1971
Diolenius Thorell, 1870
Ecuadattus Zhang & Maddison, 2012
Efate Berland, 1938
Emathis Simon, 1899
Ergane L. Koch, 1881
Euochin Prószyński, 2018
Euophrys C. L. Koch, 1834
Euryattus Thorell, 1881
Featheroides Peng, Yin, Xie & Kim, 1994
Foliabitus Zhang & Maddison, 2012
Frewena Richardson, 2013
Furculattus Balogh, 1980
Gorgasella Chickering, 1946
Hypoblemum Peckham & Peckham, 1886
Ilargus Simon, 1901
Jotus L. Koch, 1881
Junxattus Prószyński & Deeleman-Reinhold, 2012, included in Laufeia by Zhang & Maddison (2015)
Lagnus L. Koch, 1879
Lakarobius Berry, Beatty & Prószyński, 1998
Laufeia Simon, 1889
Lauharulla Keyserling, 1883
Lepidemathis Simon, 1903
Leptathamas Balogh, 1980
Lophostica Simon, 1902
Maeota Simon, 1901
Magyarus Żabka, 1985
Maileus Peckham & Peckham, 1907
Maratus Karsch, 1878
Margaromma Keyserling, 1882
Marma Simon, 1902
Mexigonus Edwards, 2003
Mopiopia Simon, 1902
Naphrys Edwards, 2003
Nebridia Simon, 1902, included in Amphidraus by Zhang & Maddison (2015)
Neonella Gertsch, 1936
Nicylla Thorell, 1890, included in Thiania by Zhang & Maddison (2015)
Ohilimia Strand, 1911
Omoedus Thorell, 1881
Opisthoncana Strand, 1913
Orcevia Thorell, 1890, included in Laufeia by Zhang & Maddison (2015)
Parabathippus Zhang & Maddison, 2012
Paraharmochirus Szombathy, 1915
Parasaitis Bryant, 1950
Parvattus Zhang & Maddison, 2012
Pensacola Peckham & Peckham, 1885
Pensacolops Bauab, 1983
Petemathis Prószyński & Deeleman-Reinhold, 2012
Phasmolia Zhang & Maddison, 2012
Platypsecas Caporiacco, 1955
Popcornella Zhang & Maddison, 2012
Pristobaeus Simon, 1902
Prostheclina Keyserling, 1882
Pseudemathis Simon, 1902
Pseudeuophrys Dahl, 1912
Pseudocorythalia Caporiacco, 1938
Pystira Simon, 1901, included in Omoedus in 2015
Rarahu Berland, 1929
Rhyphelia Simon, 1902
Rumburak Wesołowska, Azarkina & Russell-Smith, 2014
Saitidops Simon, 1901
Saitis Simon, 1876
Saitissus Roewer, 1938
Saphrys Zhang & Maddison, 2015
Saratus Otto & Hill, 2017
Semnolius Simon, 1902
Servaea Simon, 1888
Sidusa Peckham & Peckham, 1895
Sigytes Simon, 1902
Sobasina Simon, 1898
Soesilarishius Makhan, 2007
Spilargis Simon, 1902
Stoidis Simon, 1901
Talavera Peckham & Peckham, 1909
Tanzania Koçak & Kemal, 2008
Tarodes Pocock, 1899
Thiania C. L. Koch, 1846
Thianitara Simon, 1903, included in Thiania by Zhang & Maddison, 2015
Thorelliola Strand, 1942
Thyenula Simon, 1902
Truncattus Zhang & Maddison, 2012
Tylogonus Simon, 1902
Udvardya Prószyński, 1992
Variratina Zhang & Maddison, 2012
Viribestus Zhang & Maddison, 2012
Viroqua Peckham & Peckham, 1901
Wallaba Mello-Leitão, 1940, considered a synonym of Sidusa by Zhang & Maddison, 2015
Xenocytaea Berry, Beatty & Prószyński, 1998
Yacuitella Galiano, 1999
Yimbulunga Wesołowska, Azarkina & Russell-Smith, 2014
Zabkattus Zhang & Maddison, 2012
Zenodorus Peckham & Peckham, 1886, included in Omoedus in 2015

One fossil genus has also been placed in the tribe:
†Pensacolatus Wunderlich, 1988

References

Salticidae